No. 246 Squadron RAF was a squadron of the Royal Air Force.

History

World War I
The squadron was formed at the former Royal Naval Air Station Seaton Carew, England on 18 August 1918 to provide coastal patrols. It was the only RAF squadron to operate the Blackburn Kangaroo. The base closed and the squadron was disbanded, in May 1919 as some sources claim, while others have 15 March 1919 or 24 March 1919.

World War II
The squadron reformed on 1 September 1942 at Bowmore on Islay to operate Short Sunderland flying boats. It began patrols in December 1942 but was disbanded on 30 April 1943.

Post-war
On 11 October 1944 it reformed at RAF Lyneham as a transport squadron flying the Consolidated Liberator, moving to RAF Holmsley South in December. The Handley Page Halifax was also used for experimental and conversion duties. In December 1944 the squadron began to convert to the Avro York. In February 1945 the squadron absorbed the VVIP Flight and the Metropolitan Communications Squadron RAF at RAF Northolt. In November 1945 the Halifax aircraft were retired and the Douglas Skymaster introduced. In 1945 the squadron standardised on the Avro York and operated scheduled services to India and the Middle East until it merged with 511 Squadron on 15 October 1946.

Aircraft operated

See also
List of Royal Air Force aircraft squadrons

References

Notes

Bibliography

 Halley, James J. The Squadrons of the Royal Air Force and Commonwealth, 1918–1988. Tonbridge, Kent, UK: Air Britain (Historians) Ltd., 1988. .
 Jefford, C.G. RAF Squadrons: A Comprehensive Record of the Movement and Equipment of All RAF Squadrons and Their Antecedents Since 1912, Shrewsbury, Shropshire, UK: Airlife Publishing, 1988. . (second revised edition 2001. .)
 Rawlings, John D.R. Coastal, Support and Special Squadrons of the RAF and their Aircraft. London: Jane's Publishing Company Ltd., 1982. .

External links

 Rafweb.org, Squadron histories of nos. 246–250 sqn

246
Maritime patrol aircraft units and formations
Aircraft squadrons of the Royal Air Force in World War II
Military units and formations established in 1918
1918 establishments in the United Kingdom
Military units and formations disestablished in 1946